The Große Olympiaschanze is a ski jumping hill located on the Gudiberg, south of the district of Partenkirchen of Garmisch-Partenkirchen, Bavaria, Germany, and is traditionally the venue of the Four Hills Tournament's New Year's jumping.

1936 Winter Olympics
At the 1936 Winter Olympics, the venue hosted the ski jumping event and the ski jumping part of the Nordic combined event. The outrun of the ski jump formed the ski stadium which held the opening and closing ceremonies and the start / finish area of the cross-country skiing competitions.

Four Hills Tournament
A world cup competition is held there every year on January 1, as a part of the Four Hills Tournament.

History
The hill has undergone two renovations in 1978 and 2007. Due to a required upgrade of the jump to the advanced technical standards of the International Skiing Federation (FIS), the construction of an entirely new ski jump was inevitable. Among projects by Zaha Hadid Architects, Behnisch Architects and others, an international architectural competition in autumn 2006 led to the decision to erect a cantilevering structure as the new landmark of ski sports, designed by terrain:loenhart&mayr. Construction at the site started on April, 26th 2007. The grand opening ceremony at the Continental Cup / Four Hills Tournament was on New Year's Day 2008. The tower offers a panoramic view of the surrounding valley of Garmisch-Partenkirchen.

Adjacent to the ski jumps is the Gudiberg alpine slalom piste, upgraded prior to the 2011 World Championships.

The current hill record is held by Dawid Kubacki who jumped 144 m during the annual New Year's Ski Jump on January 1, 2021. Anders Jacobsen had previously jumped 145 m during training on December 31, 2014, but this did not count as a new hill record as it was training before qualification.

External links

References

Venues of the 1936 Winter Olympics
Olympic cross-country skiing venues
Olympic Nordic combined venues
Buildings and structures in Garmisch-Partenkirchen (district)
Four Hills Tournament
Ski jumping venues in Germany
Sport in Garmisch-Partenkirchen
Olympic stadiums
Olympic ski jumping venues
Sports venues in Bavaria